Lestes falcifer is a species of spreadwing in the damselfly family Lestidae. It is found in South America.

References

Further reading

 

Lestes
Articles created by Qbugbot
Insects described in 1918